Neostethus is a genus of fishes in the family Phallostethidae, native to freshwater and brackish habitats in southeast Asia, with the majority of the species restricted to the Philippines.

Species
There are currently 12 recognized species in this genus:

 Neostethus amaricola (Villadolid & Manacop, 1934)
 Neostethus bicornis Regan, 1916
 Neostethus borneensis Herre, 1939
 Neostethus ctenophorus (Aurich, 1937)
 Neostethus geminus Parenti, 2014
 Neostethus djajaorum Parenti & Louie, 1998
 Neostethus lankesteri Regan, 1916
 Neostethus palawanensis (G. S. Myers, 1935)
 Neostethus robertsi Parenti, 1989
 Neostethus thessa (Aurich, 1937)
 Neostethus villadolidi Herre, 1942
 Neostethus zamboangae Herre, 1942

References

Phallostethinae